The 3rd Jersey Road Race was a Formula One motor race held on 28 April 1949 at the St. Helier Circuit, in Saint Helier, Jersey. The 55-lap race was won by ERA driver Bob Gerard. Emmanuel de Graffenried finished second in a Maserati, and Raymond Mays was third in another ERA. Maserati driver Luigi Villoresi set pole position and fastest lap but finished sixth.Bugatti driver Kenneth Bear was killed in an accident during practice.

Results

References

Jersey Road Race
Sport in Jersey
Saint Helier
Road Race